Steve Kordek (December 26, 1911 – February 19, 2012) was an American businessman of Polish descent who was best known for the design of the pinball machines.

Kordek is credited with designing over 100 pinball machines.  The last game Kordek helped design was 2003's Vacation America. Among the companies that Kordek designed for are Genco, Williams and Bally.

Kordek was credited with many innovations to pinball machines.  He revised the pin game machines of the 1930s by putting two inward-facing flippers at the bottom of the playing field that were controlled by two buttons on the side of the machine. Other innovations still used today are drop targets and multi-ball mode.

Kordek died on February 19, 2012, at age 100.

Kordek can be seen at the age of 81 when the television show Wild Chicago toured the Williams factory in 1993

References

External links 

 Wild Chicago visits Williams Pinball video on YouTube

1911 births
2012 deaths
American centenarians
Men centenarians
American people of Polish descent
Pinball game designers
20th-century American businesspeople